Blake Lamont Converse (born 1965) is a United States Navy rear admiral and submarine warfare officer serving as deputy commander of the United States Pacific Fleet since May 7, 2021. As deputy commander, he deputizes for the Commander, U.S. Pacific Fleet and handles the fleet's day-to-day administration from headquarters in Joint Base Pearl Harbor–Hickam. He previously served as commander of submarine forces of the Pacific Fleet from February 21, 2019 to April 29, 2021.

Converse's flag assignments include Director, Joint and Fleet Operations (N3), United States Fleet Forces Command and Commander, Submarine Group 9.

References

Living people
People from Philadelphia
Military personnel from Philadelphia
Recipients of the Defense Superior Service Medal
Recipients of the Legion of Merit
Pennsylvania State University alumni
Naval Postgraduate School alumni
United States submarine commanders
United States Navy admirals
1965 births